Presidential elections were held in Chile on 25 and 26 July 1841. Carried out through a system of electors, they resulted in the election of General Manuel Bulnes as President.

There was no organized opposition to the conservative Bulnes, although liberals rallied around Francisco Antonio Pinto, who was proclaimed candidate without his consent. Pinto went on to become an adviser to President Bulnes.

Results

References

Presidential elections in Chile
Chile
1841 in Chile